Carlos Berrocal (born May 18, 1957) is a former backstroke and freestyle swimmer from Puerto Rico. He competed for his native country at the 1976 Summer Olympics in Montréal, Quebec, Canada.

Two years later Berrocal won the bronze medal in the Men's 4 × 100 m Medley Relay at the 1979 Pan American Games, alongside Orlando Catinchi, Arnaldo Pérez, and Fernando Cañales.  He was one of the Torch Lighters at the 2010 Central American and Caribbean Games.  The Natatorio RUM now bears his name.

References

External links
 

1957 births
Living people
Puerto Rican male swimmers
Male backstroke swimmers
Puerto Rican male freestyle swimmers
Olympic swimmers of Puerto Rico
People from Mayagüez, Puerto Rico
Swimmers at the 1976 Summer Olympics
Swimmers at the 1979 Pan American Games
Pan American Games bronze medalists for Puerto Rico
Pan American Games medalists in swimming
Central American and Caribbean Games gold medalists for Puerto Rico
Competitors at the 1974 Central American and Caribbean Games
Competitors at the 1978 Central American and Caribbean Games
Central American and Caribbean Games medalists in swimming
Medalists at the 1979 Pan American Games